Casper Andreas (born September 28, 1972) is a Swedish actor, film director, screenwriter, and film producer based in New York City.  He is openly gay.

Career
Andreas was born in Sweden. He made his feature film debut as a director with the romantic comedy Slutty Summer (2004). Since then, he has directed numerous, award-winning films, including A Four Letter Word (2007), Between Love and Goodbye (2008), The Big Gay Musical (2009), and Violet Tendencies (2010). His most recent film Going Down in LA-LA Land appeared at several film festivals in 2011. Variety suggested that Andreas "shows signs of maturing talent" with this film and called his performance "dangerously sexy."

Andreas has worked with talents such as Mindy Cohn, Alec Mapa, Bruce Vilanch, and Marcus Patrick. He is the head of Embrem Entertainment.

Going Down in LA-LA Land
Based on the literary work of Andy Zeffer, Casper Andreas directed the 2011 film Going Down in LA-LA Land. The film follows a struggling actor, Adam, as he moves to Hollywood and tries to break into the film business. With his friend Nick's urging, Adam takes a role in front of the camera and becomes an instant success ... in gay pornography.
"It's the gay Pretty Woman," states Andreas, "It wasn't meant to glamorize the porn industry in any way, but I needed to show how (Adam) gets seduced by it. Adam loses control."

Kiss Me, Kill Me
In October 2014, Casper Andreas with screenwriter/producer David Michael Barrett launched a funding campaign for a new film project titled Kiss Me, Kill Me.

Filmography

See also
 LGBT culture in New York City
 List of LGBT people from New York City

References

External links

Official website

1972 births
Living people
Swedish male film actors
Swedish film directors
Swedish LGBT screenwriters
Swedish male screenwriters
Gay screenwriters
LGBT film directors
Swedish LGBT actors
LGBT film producers
21st-century Swedish LGBT people